East Longmeadow School District is a public school district in the town of East Longmeadow, Massachusetts.

It includes the following schools, East Longmeadow High School (Opened 1959), Birchland Park Middle School, (Opened 2000. See Decommissioned Schools for the old Birchland), Mapleshade Elementary School (Opened 1955), Mountain View Elementary School (Opened 1961), and Meadow Brook Elementary School (Opened 1969).

Decommissioned Schools 
The following three schools were discontinued. These are the following.

Center School (Elementary)  (Opened September 1889. Closed February 14, 1969).

Pleasant View Elementary School (Opened 1916, Closed June 29, 1976)

Old Birchland Park Middle School (Opened 1951. Closed 2000.)

References

External links

School districts in Massachusetts